The Internet Ruined My Life is an American reality television series that was made by Atomic Entertainment and Left/Right Productions for the Syfy Network in the United States that "exposes the unexpected perils of living in a social media obsessed world."

The first season consisting of six episodes began airing on March 9, 2016, and concluded April 13, 2016.

Plot
This show profiles different people whose lives have been severely impacted by Internet technology and social media.

Episodes 
Each half-hour episode is split into two segments telling two different stories.

References

External links
 
 

2010s American reality television series
Syfy original programming
2016 American television series debuts
2016 American television series endings